Gentian Buzali (born August 20, 1978) is an Albanian former footballer who played in the Canadian National Soccer League, USL A-League, Canadian Professional Soccer League, and the Western Ontario Soccer League.

Playing career 
Buzali immigrated to Canada and played with Toronto Croatia in the Canadian National Soccer League. The following season, he signed with the Toronto Lynx of the USL A-League. He made his debut on August 26, 1998, against the Long Island Rough Riders coming on as a substitute for David Diplacido. In the 1999 season he appeared in 9 matches. In 2000, he returned to Toronto Croatia to play in the Canadian Professional Soccer League, and made his return on May 31, 2000, against Glen Shields Sun Devils. During the season he assisted in claiming the CPSL Championship in a 2-1 victory over Toronto Olympians. In 2001, he signed with London City and made his debut on May 25, 2001, against Toronto Supra, where he managed to record a goal. He played with London for three seasons, and received a trial in 2002 with Oliveira do Bairro S.C.

In 2006, he played with London White Eagles in the Western Ontario Soccer League, where he was the top goalscorer for two straight seasons in the Premier Division. In 2009, he played with division rivals London Croatia and in 2010 he returned to London City to play in the Canadian Soccer League.

References 

1978 births
Living people
Association football forwards
Albanian footballers
Toronto Croatia players
Toronto Lynx players
London City players
Canadian National Soccer League players
A-League (1995–2004) players
Canadian Soccer League (1998–present) players
Albanian expatriate footballers
Expatriate soccer players in Canada
Albanian expatriate sportspeople in Canada